Associazione Sportiva Dilettantistica Albignasego Calcio (formerly Universitaria Albignasego) is an Italian association football club located in Albignasego, Veneto. It currently plays in Eccellenza.

It has set a record in Italian football as it has been promoted 5 times in 5 years: this means they've always won their championship for the last 5 years.

History

Albignasego Calcio 

The club was founded in 1959 as Albignasego Calcio. In 2008 the club was promoted for the first time in Serie D.

In 2010 it merged with Calcio San Paolo Padova.

Rebirth

Universitaria Albignasego 

The CUS Calcio Padova was founded in 1946 in the University of Padua.

In summer 2010 it moved to Albignasego and changed their denomination to Universitaria Albignasego.

Albignasego Calcio 

In 2013, after changing its name to Albignasego Calcio, it is promoted in Prima Categoria.

Colors and badge 
Its color is garnet.

References

External links 
Official site

Football clubs in Veneto
Association football clubs established in 1959
1959 establishments in Italy